Ocean City Municipal Airport  is a public facility serving Ocean City, a town in Worcester County, Maryland, United States. It is located 3 statute miles (5 km) southwest of town, off Route 611 in West Ocean City.
The airport opened in October 1960.

Most U.S. airports use the same three-letter location identifier for the FAA and IATA, but Ocean City Municipal Airport is OXB to the FAA and OCE to the IATA.

Facilities and aircraft 

For the 12-month period ending May 28, 2009, the airport had an average of 101 operations per day: 78% Transient general aviation, 20% Local general aviation, and 2% military. There are 44 aircraft based at this airport: 36 single engine, 5 multi-engine, 2 helicopters and 1 ultralight.

Ocean Aviation is the full-service FBO available on airport grounds, serving as Ocean City's Cessna pilot center and FAA Part 141 approved flight academy.

Ocean City Municipal Airport offers biplane rides for $25, on a biplane called the "Cloud Dancer." This is a fairly popular attraction, as the biplane used for this is often seen over the skies of Ocean City. Helicopter rides are also given, using a Robinson R22. Skydiving services are also offered.

History
Ocean City airport opened in 1960. During the early 1980's, the airport saw commercial airline service to Baltimore by Allegheny Commuter and Henson the Piedmont Regional Airline.

In 1994, Jimmy Mathis piloted a Cessna 172 Solo from Ocean City, Maryland to Long Beach, California, becoming the youngest solo aviator ever to fly cross country.

References

External links 

Airports in Maryland
Transportation buildings and structures in Worcester County, Maryland
Ocean City, Maryland
Airports established in 1960
1960 establishments in Maryland